Ruslan Hamid oglu Muradov (27 June 1973, Mingachevir, Azerbaijan SSR – 22 August 1992, Papravənd, Agdam, Azerbaijan) was the National Hero of Azerbaijan and warrior during the First Nagorno-Karabakh War.

Early life and education 
Muradov was born on 27 June 1973 in Mingachevir, Azerbaijan SSR. In 1990, he completed his secondary education in Mingachevir. He later worked at Mingachevir Technical Rubber Plant, where his father worked. He joined Azerbaijani Armed Forces in 1992 and was appointed to the Papravand village of Agdam District.

Muradov was single.

First Nagorno-Karabakh War 
When Armenians attacked the territory of Azerbaijan, Muradov voluntarily joined Azerbaijani Armed Forces and was sent to participate in the battles around the village of Papravand of Agdam District. The village was released from Armenian soldiers.

In 1992, one of the aircraft belonging to Azerbaijan fled to the territory controlled by Armenian soldiers and was shot down. A group of Azerbaijani soldiers was sent to rescue the wounded.

Muradov was killed during the battles for the Papravand village of Agdam District on August 22, 1992.

Honors 
Ruslan Hamid oglu Muradov was posthumously awarded the title of the "National Hero of Azerbaijan" by Presidential Decree No. 290 dated 6 November 1992.

He was buried at a Martyrs' Lane cemetery in Mingachevir. The Secondary School No. 15 in Mingachevir was named after him.

See also 
 First Nagorno-Karabakh War
 List of National Heroes of Azerbaijan

References

Further reading 
Vüqar Əsgərov. Azərbaycanın Milli Qəhrəmanları (kitab)|"Azərbaycanın Milli Qəhrəmanları" (Yenidən işlənmiş II nəşr). Bakı: "Dərələyəz-M", 2010, səh. 215.

1973 births
1992 deaths
Azerbaijani military personnel
Azerbaijani military personnel of the Nagorno-Karabakh War
Azerbaijani military personnel killed in action
National Heroes of Azerbaijan
People from Mingachevir